Parc del Fòrum (Catalan for Forum Park) is a public park located between the district of Sant Martí in Barcelona and Sant Adrià de Besòs. It was built in 2004 following Elías Torres' and José Antonio Martínez Lapeñas's original design in order to hold the international cultural event Fòrum Universal de les Cultures, celebrated in 2004. It is operated by Ajuntament de Barcelona and Barcelona Serveis Municipals.

History 
The Parc del Fòrum hosted the Universal Forum of Cultures held in Barcelona during 2004. The event, devised by the then-mayor of the city Joan Clos, raised a strong controversy in the city due to alleged plots of urban speculation, which never came to be demonstrated. The event allowed new urban changes in the city: the entire Besós area was recovered, until then populated by old disused factories, the entire Poblenou neighborhood was regenerated and the new Diagonal Mar neighborhood was built, while it was equipped the city of new parks and spaces for the leisure of citizens. The site was designed by Elías Torres and José Antonio Martínez Lapeña, which highlights a multipurpose esplanade of 16 has culminated at one end by a large solar panel, which It became one of the emblems of the event and gives electric energy to 140 families nowadays.

The main construction was the Forum building (2000-2004), by Jacques Herzog and Pierre de Meuron -current headquarters of the Natural Sciences Museum of Barcelona and the Forum Auditorium-, with a triangular low profile with a distribution of several interior courtyards that generate open spaces, and a rough-looking facade of indigo blue, furrowed by various strips of glass. Next to this building was the International Convention Center of Barcelona (2000-2004), by Josep Lluís Mateo, with a metal layout structure irregular and undulating shapes that hide the supporting elements, generating large open spaces of flexible arrangement inside.

Spaces 
The main space consists of a huge esplanade called Plaça del Fòrum (Forum Square), designed by Torres and Lapeña. It is the site where the solar panel is located as well as some pieces of public art like "Los Pajaritos" or the "Bosc de Columnes" (Column Forest), which is mainly used for ludic events. The Parc del Fòrum also includes:

 Parc del Camp de la Bota: located in the old neighbourhood of Campo de la Bota, it occupies the space where its castle was located. The castle was used to execute and torture people during the Francoist dictatorship (1936-1975). Nowadays it hosts a park for kids, the "column forest" as well as some pieces of public art and a monument that commemorates those who were murdered in the castle. Barcelona's Natural Science Museum is located there as well as the Auditori del Fòrum, which has a maximum capacity of 3,300 people.
Parc dels Auditoris (Auditorium Complex): designed by Alejandro Zaera, this space hosts two public air auditoriums meant to host concerts and other types of shows.
Plataforma Marina: originally built to host a marine zoo (but cancelled due to the financial crisis), this flat platform is used to host many shows like Cirque du Soleil's "Messi 10" show or Primavera Sound's biggest stage.
Zona de Banys (Bathing Area): designed by Beth Galí and Jaume Benavent, it is a two-hectare non-sand artificial beach where people can go and dip in the sea. It has ladders and ramps in order to make it look like a pool and to guarantee the security of the swimmers. There is also an artificial island equipped with sun beds and parasols. Showers and locker rooms are also part of this space apart from other elements and services.

The zone closer to Sant Adrià consists of the Forum Beach, a marina, restaurants, a natural park and an active fabrique.

Use 
Since the 2004 Universal Forum of Cultures, the park has hosted many events as well as worldwide known music festivals. Here are some:

Barcelona Acció Musical: this part of the Festes de la Mercè that consists of a series of musical shows is sometimes held at the Parc del Fòrum during its annual celebration in September.
 Barcelona Beach Festival: also known as BBF, it takes place at the Forum Beach every July. It reunites the biggest artists in electronic music.

 Festival Cruïlla: the music festival moved to Barcelona in 2010, leaving Mataró. Calle 13, Love of Lesbian, M.I.A., Vetusta Morla, Of Monsters and Men, Kendrick Lamar, Emeli Sandé, Txarango, Pet Shop Boys, Two Door Cinema Club, LP, Zaz, The Roots, The Black Eyed Peas and Gwen Stefani among others have visited the festival.
Nits del Fòrum: comprising 70 concerts in over two months, this concert series festival at the Auditorium Complex is set to begin in July 2020. It is organized by Primavera Sound.
Primavera Sound: the worldwide known indie and alternative music festival takes place annually between the end of May and the beginning of June in the park. Over 200 acts play at the festival every year. Musical icons such as Arctic Monkeys, Beck, Gorillaz, The Strokes, Tame Impala, Miley Cyrus, Lorde, Bjork, Rosalía, Bad Bunny, Arcade Fire, Massive Attack, Bon Iver and Radiohead have headlined the festival since its first edition in 2001.
Reggaeton Beach Festival: this Latin music festival takes place annually in July. It reunites the biggest artists in the reggaeton genre like Becky G, Ozuna, Daddy Yankee, Karol G, Rels B etc. Other editions take place in Benidorm, Palma and Madrid.
Summercase: the festival ran from 2006 to 2008 and also visited Madrid. Primal Scream and Sex Pistols visited the festival.
Telecogresca: the biggest music festival for university students takes place at the Parc del Fòrum since 2014. The line-up normally consists of Catalan rumba and hip hop acts.

See also 

 Urban planning of Barcelona

Fòrum